The 2008–09 UMass Minutemen basketball team represented the University of Massachusetts Amherst during the 2008–09 NCAA Division I men's basketball season. The Minutemen, led by first year head coach Derek Kellogg, played their home games at William D. Mullins Memorial Center and are members of the Atlantic 10 Conference. They finished the season 12-18, 7-9 in A-10 play to finish for tenth place.

Roster

Schedule

|-
!colspan=9| Exhibition

|-
!colspan=9| Regular Season

|-
!colspan=9| 2009 Atlantic 10 men's basketball tournament

References

UMass Minutemen basketball seasons
Umass